Cesar Chavez is an outdoor statue depicting the American labor leader and civil rights activist of the same name by artist Pablo Eduardo, installed on the University of Texas at Austin campus, in Austin, Texas. The bronze sculpture was unveiled on the West Mall, between Battle Hall and the West Mall Office Building, in October 2007.

See also

 2007 in art
 List of places named after Cesar Chavez

References

External links
  (January 5, 2009), University of Texas at Austin

2007 establishments in Texas
2007 sculptures
Bronze sculptures in Texas
Cesar Chavez
Flags in art
Monuments and memorials in Texas
Outdoor sculptures in Austin, Texas
Sculptures of men in Texas
Statues in Austin, Texas
University of Texas at Austin campus